Gary Ambroise (born 17 July 1985) is a professional footballer who plays for Belgian club White Star Bruxelles, as a striker.

Born in France, he represents Haiti at international level.

Career
Ambroise has played in France for FC Les Lilas and US Roye-Noyon, and in Belgium for Tubize.

He made his international debut for Haiti in 2011, and has appeared in FIFA World Cup qualifying matches.

References

External links
 

1985 births
Living people
French footballers
Haitian footballers
French sportspeople of Haitian descent
Citizens of Haiti through descent
A.F.C. Tubize players
Footballers from Paris
Haiti international footballers
RWS Bruxelles players
Doxa Katokopias FC players
Challenger Pro League players
Cypriot First Division players
Haitian expatriate footballers
Expatriate footballers in Cyprus
US Roye-Noyon players
FC Les Lilas players
Association football forwards